The golden pygmy perch (Nannoperca variegata) is a species of temperate perch endemic to Australia, where it is found in both Ewens Ponds and Deep Creek, South Australia, and several tributaries of the Glenelg River in Victoria.  It prefers flowing water of ponds or small streams, generally being more commonly found in the streams that connect to the ponds, with plentiful vegetation or debris to provide shelter.  It preys on extremely small crustaceans and aquatic insects.  This species can reach  SL.  It can also be found in the aquarium trade.

References

Nannoperca
Freshwater fish of Australia
Taxonomy articles created by Polbot
Fish described in 1986